Serial Killing 4 Dummys is a 1999 dark comedy film written and directed by Trace Slobotkin and starring Thomas Haden Church and Justin Urich.

Plot
Casey is a troubled teenager who wants to be a serial killer. He teams up with Sasha, his suicidal classmate who wants to be his first victim, to plan his murders. However trouble soon arises when it turns out there's a real serial killer in town who turns his victims into furniture, and that killer is Casey's gym teacher.

Background
The film first screened at film festivals and had limited release in theaters in the late 1990s under the title Serial Killing 101, before its "official" theatrical release in February 2002.  When released on video in 2004, it was retitled Serial Killing 4 Dummys.

Reception
Upon its screening in 1998 at the Convergence Film Festival in Rhode Island, The Providence Journal wrote the film was "as fresh as the latest TV news break-in report." and "In the real world of schoolground slayings, Serial Killing 4 Dummys is in very bad taste. But that's the point. This black comedy, filled with barbed irony, is about the disaffected and talentless, who only see headline-grabbing mayhem as their way out of their personal ruts. And it shoves our noses in it."

Beyond Hollywood wrote "the movie is much better than it really has any right to be", and that as both writer and director, Trace Slobotkin "oftentimes manages to ascend beyond the constraints of the movie."  They note that the film is not without its issues, and that the background issue of there being a real serial killer at work does not begin to make its impact until after the first 20 minutes.

Partial cast
 Thomas Haden Church as Vince Grimaldi
 Justin Urich as Casey Noland
 Lisa Loeb as Sasha Fitzgerald
 Rick Overton as Mr. Korn
 George Murdock as Detective Ray Berro
 Corey Feldman as Store Clerk
 Barbara Niven as Donna Noland
 Stuart Stone as Amil
 Raymond O'Connor as Frank
 Esther Scott as Sally Lindon
 Chris Weber as Mark Pekla
 Mark Thompson as Chuck, Weatherman
 Jennifer Loto as Marni Greenstein
 Michael Alaimo as Mr. Rabino
 Tegan West as Detective Pessin

References

External links
 

1999 films
American comedy horror films
1999 horror films
1990s English-language films
1990s American films